Ante Anić (born 8 June 1989) is a Croatian footballer who plays for Austrian amateur side ASK Hausmening.

Club career
After playing in the three top tiers of Croatian football, he moved to Austria and has played on different levels there as well but most notably with Blau-Weiß Linz in the second tier and with SV Gmunden.

References

External links
 
 

1989 births
Living people
Footballers from Zagreb
Association football midfielders
Croatian footballers
NK Rudeš players
NK Imotski players
NK HAŠK players
HNK Gorica players
NK Vrbovec players
NK Karlovac players
FC Blau-Weiß Linz players
SV Gmunden players
Second Football League (Croatia) players
First Football League (Croatia) players
Croatian Football League players
Austrian Regionalliga players
2. Liga (Austria) players
Austrian Landesliga players
Croatian expatriate footballers
Expatriate footballers in Austria
Croatian expatriate sportspeople in Austria